The Roman Catholic Church in Mali is composed of 1 ecclesiastical provinces and 5 suffragan dioceses.  Its bishops form the Episcopal Conference of Mali.

List of dioceses

Ecclesiastical Province of Bamako 
 Archdiocese of Bamako
 Diocese of Kayes
 Diocese of Mopti
 Diocese of San
 Diocese of Ségou
 Diocese of Sikasso

External links 
Catholic-Hierarchy entry.
GCatholic.org.

Mali
Catholic dioceses